The Pisa–Rome railway (also called the ferrovia Tirrenica—"Tyrrhenian Railway") is one of the trunk lines of the Italian railway network. It connects Italy’s northwest with its south, running along the Tyrrhenian coast between the Italian  regions of Tuscany and Lazio, through the provinces of Livorno, Grosseto, Viterbo and Rome. The line is double track and is fully electrified at 3,000 V DC. Passenger traffic is managed by Trenitalia.

An international branch line connects from the Pisa–Rome railway at Roma San Pietro railway station to Vatican City: the 300-metre Vatican railway.

History

The southernmost section of the line between Rome and Civitavecchia was opened on 24 April 1859 by the Società Pio Central (Italian for Central Pius Company). In 1862 work started on a line south from Livorno, which initially ran east to Collesalvetti before turning south and joining the path of the current Pisa–Rome line at Vada (now 27 km south of Livorno). This route is now known as the Maremmana railway. The line continued south from Vada and was opened to Nunziatella, near Capalbio, on the border with the Papal States on the Chiarone river in 1864. In 1865 the Leopolda railway was taken over by the owner of the Rome–Civitavecchia railway, now called the Società per le Strade Ferrate Romane (Roman Railways).  It opened the connecting section between Civitavecchia and Capalbio in 1867. In 1910 a direct line was opened along the coast from Vada to the new central station at Livorno. A new route was opened between Rome and Maccarese-Fregene via Aurelia on 25 May 1990.

References

Footnotes

Sources

 
 }

See also 
 List of railway lines in Italy

External links

Railway lines in Lazio
Railway lines in Tuscany
Railway lines opened in 1867
1867 establishments in Italy